"Casi Te Envidio" (English: I Almost Envy You) is a song by Puerto Rican salsa recording artist Andy Montañez, from his eleventh studio album, El Eterno Enamorado (1988). It was composed by Maestro Moncada, produced by Paco Cepero, and released as the lead single from the album on 16 July 1988.

It was rerecorded with Puerto Rican recording artist Ivy Queen, in 2015 on her ninth studio album, Vendetta.

Rerecording
In August 2012, Queen released her eighth studio album, Musa. The album peaked at number fifteen on the Billboard Latin Albums chart and number two on the Billboard Latin Rhythm Albums chart. Upon its release, the album remained within the five best-selling albums of the urban genre, in the United States and Puerto Rico, according to SoundScan monitoring services of the recognized measurement firm Nielsen. However, it was the lowest first week sales for Queen since the release of her fourth studio album Real in 2004. It still, however, managed to receive a Latin Grammy Nomination for Best Urban Music Album at the Latin Grammy Awards of 2013.

It was announced in September 2013, that Queen had changed management and returned with Jorge "Goguito" Guadalupe, president and co-founder of Filtro Musik, to release her ninth studio album, entitled Vendetta. Following the birth of her first biological child, Queen then announced that she would embark on a U.S. tour entitled the "Viva Puerto Rico Tour". The tour, launched on 29 January 2014, included performances at various gay clubs in cities of the United States and Puerto Rico, such as New York, Orlando, Miami, Houston, Seattle, San Francisco, San Diego, Atlanta, Sacramento, Los Angeles, Tampa, and Ponce. Queen then announced that her she was working on her ninth studio album and that it would be released in February 2014, and later some time in 2014.

Charts

References

1988 singles
Ivy Queen songs
Rodven Records singles
Spanish-language songs
Salsa songs
Andy Montañez songs